"Bloody Stream" (stylized as "BLOODY STREAM") is the debut single by Japanese artist Coda. The song, written by Saori Kodama and composed by Toshiyuki O'mori, is used as the second opening theme for the 2012 anime adaptation of the 1987 manga JoJo's Bizarre Adventure, representing its second arc Battle Tendency. The song is noted as having an emotional and fashionable tune, with the husky yet charming voice of the song vocalist adding a further stylish nature to the song as a whole. Jun Yamamoto of Billboard said that he felt that the horns and funky sound of the song complement the story of Joseph Joestar and his battle against the Pillar Men Esidisi, Wamuu, and Kars, further mesmerizing him and drawing him into a "bizarre world".

In its first week of sales, "Bloody Stream" sold 21 thousand units, reaching the number 4 spot on the Oricon's Weekly Album Charts. It also reached number 7 on Billboards Japan Hot 100, 3 on the Japan Hot Single Sales chart, and number 2 on the Japan Hot Animation chart.

Track listing

References

2013 singles
JoJo's Bizarre Adventure songs
2013 songs
Warner Music Group singles
Animated series theme songs